Bhaniyana is a census village mostly of the ethnic group Rajput, Jaat, Paliwal, Maheshwari and Banjara, in the Jaisalmer district, Rajasthan, India.

It is located 110 km east of Jaisalmer and 36 km south of Pokaran. Bhaniyana has a population of 500 families, of which Bhati (Rajput),  Brahman, Maheshwari, Vaishnava, Banjara, Jat, and Muslims families are in village. Agriculture is the main source of food. Bheem Talab (Bheem Pond) is the source of fresh water in Bhaniyana, and also provides water to several other villages. Bhaniyana also has a rich political and social history. The village has a literacy rate of 86%.

Government organisations
 Tehsil and sup division magistrate
 Govt sr sec school
 Govt Sr Secondary School Bhaniyana
 Govt Secondary Girls School
 BR. Public Sr Secondary School
 Shri chhotusingh sr sec school
 Banks Only Gramin Bank
 Post office
 Cooperative society
 Police Station Bhaniyana
 Hospital and many other govt office
 Karwasra market Jodhpur road Bhaniyana
 kissan chatrawas bhaniyana
 Riico Industrial Area

Villages in Jaisalmer district